Texas's 25th congressional district of the United States House of Representatives stretches from Arlington and Fort Worth to some of its outer southwestern suburbs, as well as rural counties east of Abilene.  The district's current Representative is Roger Williams.

History 
The 25th district was created as a result of the redistricting cycle after the 1980 census. The district was originally anchored in the southern parts of Houston and Harris County, including the Texas Medical Center, the Astrodome, Astroworld and the southern shores of the Houston Ship Channel, as well as Rice University, Hobby Airport and Ellington Field. An economically and racially diverse district that narrowly favored Ronald Reagan in 1980, the 25th encompassed such a diverse collection of Houston neighborhoods including both the middle-class suburban neighborhoods of Westbury and Meyerland in southwest Houston (the latter also being the center of Houston's Jewish community) and Park Place and Glenbrook Valley in southeast Houston, the majority African-American neighborhoods of Sunnyside and South Park in southern Houston and Harris County, and much of southeast Harris County including northern parts of the Clear Lake City master-planned community in southeast Houston and such working-class suburbs as Pasadena, Deer Park, La Porte and Seabrook. Much of this area previously comprised the northern half of the previous 22nd district represented by conservative Republican Ron Paul, and at the time was largely prosperous as Houston continued to benefit from the oil boom of the previous decade that resulted in thousands moving to the Houston area during this time, as well as from growing medical and space industry sectors that benefited respectively from both the increased prominence of the Med Center and the launch of the Space Shuttle program. In the 1980 election, Paul narrowly defeated former Harris County assistant district attorney Mike Andrews in his 1980 reelection to a second full term, largely on the basis of his strong support in the then-emerging Republican stronghold of Fort Bend County as well as his home county of Brazoria.

While Paul's 22nd district was redrawn into a heavily Republican seat comprising the aforementioned emerging suburban counties, along with a largely Republican section of southwest Houston and Harris County along the Southwest Freeway (what eventually became Interstate 69), that he would win reelection in 1982, the new 25th took in much of the former 22nd's Democratic-leaning Harris County portion. In the 1982 election, Andrews was the Democratic nominee for the new district against Republican attorney Mike Faubion, winning 60.4 percent of the vote in a district whose voters largely favored President Reagan's economic program but otherwise favored abortion rights and defense spending. Despite Republican landslides in 1984 by Reagan and in 1988 by adopted son and Vice President George H. W. Bush, Andrews would go on to win reelection easily, with his reelection in 1984 against future state senator and Texas Land Commissioner Jerry Patterson (in which Andrews won 64 percent of the vote) being the closest the district came to being competitive during its original iteration, and even ran unopposed in 1986 and 1990 as the district was hit hard by the impact of the 1980s oil glut that deeply affected Houston's economy, including plummeting real estate values, rising crime numbers and dramatic racial shifts in parts of the district where Anglo residents moved out to suburban areas south of the city including Sugar Land, Pearland, Missouri City and Friendswood.

The 25th district was radically altered in the 1992 and 1994 elections, with many majority Black and Hispanic precincts moved into the 18th district of Democrat Craig Washington and the new majority-Hispanic 29th district that would be won by Anglo Democrat Gene Green, respectively. The new district would take a combination of mostly white moderate and working-class communities in southwest and southeast Houston as well as southern and eastern Harris County, including most of Pasadena, Baytown and Channelview along with the Texas Medical Center, along with an eastern spur of Fort Bend County including a mostly Black southwest section of the city of Houston. In this new iteration, Andrews would face his toughest reelection to date in 1992 against Republican challenger Dolly Madison McKenna, who polled 41.4 percent of the vote to 56 percent for Andrews. After Andrews vacated the seat to make an unsuccessful run for the Democratic nomination for U.S. Senate in 1994 against Republican Kay Bailey Hutchison, Democratic investment banker Ken Bentsen, the nephew of former U.S. Senator and then-Secretary of the Treasury Lloyd Bentsen, won the seat in a close race with 52.3 percent of the vote against Republican opponent Gene Fontenot who polled 45 percent.

After the 18th and 29th districts were struck down by the Supreme Court in Bush v. Vera as an unconstitutional racial gerrymander in 1996, the 25th would be altered into a more compact district that stayed entirely within Harris County, stretching from the Westchase and Alief areas of southwest Houston, through southern parts of Houston and Harris County, stretching all the way to the eastern parts of the Houston Ship Channel and Harris County, encompassing such suburbs as upper-middle class Bellaire and West University Place in the west and working-class Baytown and Pasadena in the east. In the 1996 special election (conducted as such as the 1996 primaries had already taken place when the districts were struck down), Bentsen would go on to win over 57 percent of the vote against Mike Andrews' 1992 opponent, Dolly Madison McKenna. The contest by McKenna would mark the beginning of a series of competitive but underdog Republican challenges for the seat over four cycles; in 1998 Bentsen would win 58 percent against Republican challenger John Sanchez, while in 2000 he polled 60 percent against Republican Phil Sudan. After Bentsen retired to make an unsuccessful run for the Democratic nomination for the open U.S. Senate of retiring Republican Phil Gramm in 2002, former Houston City Council member Chris Bell defeated Republican Tom Reiser with less than 55 percent of the vote in a district that stretched from the affluent River Oaks neighborhood west of downtown Houston to much of southwest and southeast Houston, along with all or parts of many of the same working-class suburbs east of Houston that had been in the previous 25th including southern parts of Pasadena and most of Baytown, Highlands and La Porte.

21st-century redistricting cycles
In 2003, after Republicans gained control of the Texas House of Representatives for the first time since Reconstruction, the new Republican majority (with outside assistance from then-U.S. House Majority Leader Tom DeLay from the neighboring 22nd district, where he had succeeded Ron Paul in 1984) radically altered the state's congressional map. The 25th district of Chris Bell's was dismantled with Bell's southwest Houston residence moved into the neighboring 7th district of two-term Republican John Culberson and much of the 25th redrawn into the new 9th district, which had been unmoored from its historical location in Galveston and had extended as far east as Beaumont at the time. While Bell ultimately sought reelection the following year in the new 9th where he lost to fellow Democrat Al Green in the Democratic primary, the new 25th now stretched from McAllen, at the U.S.-Mexico border, all the way to a heavily Democratic southeastern portion of Austin and was informally referred to by political pundits and the Texas press as "the fajita strip". The new district would be won by incumbent Democrat Lloyd Doggett, who had previously represented the neighboring 10th district since being elected in 1994. After a lawsuit resulted in the 23rd district of Republican Henry Bonilla being struck down, the 25th was redrawn again, this time with the district now stretching from most of central and southeast Austin to several heavily Republican rural counties southeast of Austin (see below); Doggett nonetheless won reelection in 2006 and 2008 with little difficulty. However, in 2010 Doggett faced his toughest reelection, winning 53 percent of the vote against Republican physician and future state senator Donna Campbell.

In July 2011, Texas Governor Rick Perry signed into law a redistricting plan ("C185"), approved by the Texas legislature in June, which gave the 25th district a completely different geography for the 2012 elections, including part of Travis County, and stretching as far north as Johnson County, south of Fort Worth. The redistricting split Travis County into five districts, four of which were heavily Republican. As a result, the only realistic place for Lloyd Doggett to run in was the new 35th district (which by weight of population is more of a San Antonio district than an Austin district); Doggett nonetheless won reelection in the new 35th. Former Texas Secretary of State and auto dealer Roger Williams, who had previously been a candidate for the U.S. Senate as early as 2010 while Kay Bailey Hutchison was still serving (she would eventually retire the following year and would be succeeded in 2012 by Ted Cruz), ultimately won a crowded Republican primary and would go on to win comfortable margins or better in a district where Democrats were only competitive in the western Travis County portion of the district (which includes some of the most Republican areas in the county including much of the area surrounding Lake Travis; Mitt Romney won 60 percent of the vote in the new district in 2012. His closest reelection came in the 2018 election, where Williams won 53.5 percent of the vote against Democratic challenger Julie Oliver and would go on to win less than 56 percent against Oliver in a rematch, as the district gave 55 percent of the vote to Donald Trump in 2016 and 2020 with Trump losing the Travis County portion by large margins. For a number of years, there was a consolidated lawsuit against the redistricting; in March 2017, a panel of federal judges ruled that the new 35th district and two others were illegally drawn with discriminatory intent. However, the district was allowed to stand in the Supreme Court's 2018 Abbott v. Perez ruling.

For the 2022 election, the 25th was redrawn into a district anchored in the southwest corner of the Dallas-Fort Worth metroplex, including a southern portion of Tarrant County encompassing most of Arlington including AT&T Stadium, Globe Life Field and Six Flags Over Texas, as well as most or all of several rural counties between the Metroplex and Abilene. Donald Trump won less than 65 percent of the vote in this new district, with only the Tarrant County portion considered competitive. Roger Williams won reelection unopposed in the new 25th district, which includes Weatherford where he owns an automobile dealership.

Recent election results from statewide races

List of members representing the district

Recent elections

2004

2006
On June 28, 2006, the U.S. Supreme Court declared that the Texas legislature's 2003 redistricting plan violated the Voting Rights Act in the case of the 23rd district. The main basis for the ruling was that the old 23rd was a protected majority-Hispanic district—in other words, if the 23rd was redrawn in a way to put Hispanics in a minority, a new majority-Hispanic district had to be created. Since the 25th was not compact enough to be an acceptable replacement, the 23rd had to be struck down. The size of the 23rd required the redrawing of nearly every district from El Paso to San Antonio.

As a result, on August 4, 2006, a three-judge panel announced replacement district boundaries for 2006 election for the 23rd district, as well as for the 15th, 21st, 25th and 28th districts. On election day in November, these five districts held open primaries; if any candidate received over 50%, they were elected. Otherwise, a runoff election in December decided the seat.

The redrawn 25th was more compact and restricted to Central Texas, comprising more of Travis County, most of Bastrop County, and all of Hays, Caldwell, Fayette, Gonzales, Lavaca, and Colorado Counties.

Incumbent congressman Doggett faced Republican Grant Rostig (formerly the Libertarian nominee), independent candidate Brian Parrett, and Libertarian Party Barbara Cunningham, and won re-election.

2008
In the 2008 election Doggett faced Republican George Morovich, a structural engineer from La Grange and Libertarian Jim Stutsman, a retired Army veteran. Doggett won with 65.8% of the vote to Morovich's 30.5% and Stutsman's 3.7%. Doggett won 73.8% of the vote in his Austin-based stronghold of Travis County.

2010
Dogget faced Republican and "Tea Party favorite" Donna Campbell, and again held his seat, though by a surprisingly small margin.

2012
The new district boundaries were more favorable to Republicans, as had been foreseen.

2014

2016

2018

2020

References

 
 Congressional Biographical Directory of the United States 1774–present

25